Carl Gripenstedt (23 February 1893 – 30 April 1981) was a Swedish fencer. He competed at the 1920 and 1924 Summer Olympics.

References

External links
 

1893 births
1981 deaths
Swedish male épée fencers
Olympic fencers of Sweden
Fencers at the 1920 Summer Olympics
Fencers at the 1924 Summer Olympics
People from Uppsala Municipality
Sportspeople from Uppsala County
Carl
20th-century Swedish people